Freya Tingley (born 26 March 1994) is an Australian actress.

Career
Tingley's first professional role was "Young Joan" in Caryl Churchill's play Far Away for The Black Swan Theatre Company in 2008. Since then she has appeared in a number of films including the short Bootleg, a singing role in the short Light as a Feather, directed by Damien Spiccia, X, directed by Jon Hewitt, and 3 voice-overs for the production Bully for You. She appeared in the television miniseries Cloudstreet based on Tim Winton's novel, in a support role as "Young Hat Lamb".

In 2011, she played the lead as a deaf girl, in the short film Beneath the Waves by director Renee Marie.

In 2012, Tingley was cast in Hemlock Grove, the Netflix series produced by Eli Roth in which she plays Christina Wendall.

In 2013, Tingley was cast in Once Upon a Time as Wendy, a 13-year-old girl based on the heroine Wendy Darling from the novel Peter Pan. Tingley won the part of Wendy after one audition upon impressing producers with her ability to project a British accent.  Wendy was only seen in a number of episodes and helped Peter Pan (Robbie Kay) gain Henry's heart. However, she is then reunited with her family. In 2014, Tingley had the lead role in The Choking Game, a movie made for Lifetime.

Tingley also played Francine Valli in Jersey Boys, directed by Clint Eastwood.

Tingley then starred in the 2016 TV series The Wilding and the film No Way to Live, which centers on an interracial teenage couple in the 1950s robbing and stealing to escape their oppressive town.

Personal life

Freya Tingley is a member of the Church of Scientology. She is the daughter of a prominent Scientologist, and according to her own testimony, she "first read Dianetics when [she] was 21".

Filmography

References

External links 
Freya Tingley's official website

Video: A Few Minutes With... "Hemlock Grove" Co-Star Freya Tingley - The FUton Critic
Video: Hemlock Grove: Freya Tingley and Landon Liboiron - 680 News

1994 births
Living people
21st-century Australian actresses
Australian child actresses
Australian stage actresses
Actresses from Perth, Western Australia
Australian film actresses
Australian television actresses